The National Patriotic Front was a clandestine political party in the Moldovan SSR.

Activity 

Between 1969 and 1971, the National Patriotic Front of Bessarabia and Northern Bukovina was established by several young intellectuals in Chişinău, totalling over 100 members, vowing to fight for the establishment of a Moldavian Democratic Republic, its secession from the Soviet Union and union with  Romania. 

Among the party's members were Alexandru Usatiuc-Bulgăr, Valeriu Graur, Alexandru Şoltoianu, Gheorghe Ghimpu, Nicolae Lupan, Tudor Basarabeanu, Nicolae Testemiţeanu, Valeriu Gagiu, Mihai Cimpoi, Mircea Druc, Anatol Corobceanu, Vasile Topală. 

In December 1971, following an informative note from Ion Stănescu, the President of the Council of State Security of the Romanian Socialist Republic, to Yuri Andropov, the chief of KGB, Alexandru Usatiuc-Bulgăr as well as Valeriu Graur, Alexandru Şoltoianu, and Gheorghe Ghimpu were arrested and sentenced in 1972 to four to seven years in prison, followed by forced settlement. 

Alexandru Şoltoianu was released only in 1988. Alexandru Usatiuc-Bulgăr was condemned to seven years in prison and five years of forced residence.

Leaders

See also
:Category:National Patriotic Front (Moldova) politicians
 List of political parties in Moldova

References

Clandestine groups
Political parties established in 1969
Political parties disestablished in 1971
Defunct political parties in Moldova
Popular fronts
Pro-independence parties in the Soviet Union
Romanian nationalism in Moldova
Anti-communist parties